The men's K-1 200 metres competition at the 2019 ICF Canoe Sprint World Championships in Szeged took place at the Olympic Centre of Szeged.

Schedule
The schedule was as follows:

All times are Central European Summer Time (UTC+2)

Results

Heats
The five fastest boats in each heat, plus the fastest remaining boat advanced to the semifinals.

Heat 1

Heat 2

Heat 3

Heat 4

Heat 5

Heat 6

Heat 7

Semifinals
Qualification was as follows:

All first and second-place boats, plus the fastest third-place boat advanced to the A final.
All other third-place boats, all fourth-place boats and the two fastest fifth-place boats advanced to the B final.
All other fifth-place boats, all sixth-place boats and the three fastest seventh-place boats advanced to the C final.

Semifinal 1

Semifinal 2

Semifinal 3

Semifinal 4

Finals

Final C
Competitors in this final raced for positions 19 to 27.

Final B
Competitors in this final raced for positions 10 to 18.

Final A
Competitors in this final raced for positions 1 to 9, with medals going to the top three.

References

ICF